The Last House on the Left is a 2009 revenge horror-thriller film directed by Dennis Iliadis (in his feature directorial debut) and written by Carl Ellsworth and Adam Alleca. It is a remake of the 1972 film of the same name, and stars Tony Goldwyn, Monica Potter, Garret Dillahunt, Spencer Treat Clark, Martha MacIsaac, and Sara Paxton. The film follows the parents (Goldwyn and Potter) of Mari Collingwood (Paxton), who attempt to get revenge on a group of strangers, led by a man named Krug (Dillahunt), that have taken shelter at their home during a thunderstorm.

The film rights were picked up by Rogue Pictures in 2006, with the remake being the first film produced by Wes Craven's new production studio Midnight Pictures. Craven, who wrote and directed the 1972 original, was interested to see what kind of film could be produced on a large budget, as the limited funds in 1972 forced him to eliminate scenes he had wanted to film to tell a complete story. Alleca's original script included elements of the supernatural, which prompted the studio to reject it and bring in Ellsworth to perform a rewrite. One of the elements director Iliadis wanted to avoid with this film, given its graphic nature, was turning it into "torture porn". For Craven and Iliadis, The Last House on the Left primarily illustrates how even the most normal of families can be driven to evil acts if pushed too far.

Released by Universal Pictures on March 13, 2009, The Last House on the Left was met with mixed reviews from critics who many deemed inferior to the 1972 film. The film however grossed approximately $46 million against a $15 million budget.

Plot

Emma and John Collingwood, and their daughter, competitive swimmer Mari, head out on vacation to their lake house. Shortly thereafter, Mari borrows the family car and drives into town to spend some time with her friend Paige. While Paige works the cash register at a local store, she and Mari meet Justin, a teenager passing through town who invites them both back to his roadside motel room to smoke marijuana. While the three are hanging out in the motel room, Justin's family members return: his father, Krug, and his uncle, Francis and Krug's girlfriend, Sadie.

Krug becomes angry at Justin for bringing unknown people to their motel room, and shows him a local newspaper that has Krug and Sadie's pictures on the front page, and which explains how Sadie and Francis broke Krug out of police custody and killed the two officers that were transporting him. Believing it would be too risky to let Paige and Mari go, the gang kidnaps them and uses their car to leave town. While Krug searches for the highway, Mari convinces him to take a road that leads to her parents' lake house; Mari then attempts to jump out of the vehicle, but the ensuing fight among the passengers causes Krug to crash into a tree. Frustrated by Mari's attempt to escape, Sadie and Francis proceed to beat Mari and Paige as they crawl from the wreckage. Krug attempts to teach Justin to "be a man" by forcing him to touch Mari's breasts. Paige begins insulting him to get him to stop; in response, Krug and Francis stab Paige repeatedly, and Mari watches her friend bleed to death. Krug then rapes Mari, during which he pulls off Mari's necklace and throws it away. When he is done, Mari musters enough strength to escape the group and make it to the lake so that she can swim to safety. Krug shoots her in the back as she swims, leaving her body floating in the lake.

A storm forces Krug, Francis, Sadie, and Justin to seek refuge at a nearby house. Justin is the only one to deduce that the inhabitants, John and Emma, are Mari's parents, and intentionally leaves Mari's necklace on the counter to alert them about their daughter. When John and Emma find Mari barely alive on their porch, and the necklace on the counter, they realize that Mari's tormentors are the people in their guest house.

As they try to find the key to their boat so that they can take Mari to the hospital, Francis happens upon Mari. Emma attacks Francis and John kills him. When going after Krug and Sadie, who are in bed, they find Justin holding Krug's gun; Justin gives the gun to John so that he can kill Krug. Sadie awakens and John shoots and wounds her in the neck, allowing Krug to escape from the couple through the window and into their house. Finding Francis dead, Krug realizes that they are Mari's parents. Sadie attacks John, then runs into the bathroom. John and Justin break in and Sadie beats them with a shower curtain rod, almost knocking them out until Emma shoots Sadie through her left eye, killing her. Krug hides, and attacks John and Justin when they search for him. Justin is stabbed by Krug, but with a combined effort from Emma and John, Krug is knocked unconscious. John, Emma, Mari, and Justin then leave in the boat for the hospital.

Later, John returns to the cabin, where he has paralyzed Krug from the neck down. John places Krug's head in a microwave. As John walks away, Krug's head explodes, ultimately killing him.

Cast

 Tony Goldwyn as Dr. John Collingwood
 Monica Potter as Emma Collingwood
 Garret Dillahunt as Krug
 Aaron Paul as Francis
 Spencer Treat Clark as Justin
 Riki Lindhome as Sadie
 Martha MacIsaac as Paige
 Michael Bowen as Officer Morton
 Sara Paxton as Mari Collingwood

Production

Development
In August 2006, Rogue Pictures finalized a deal to remake The Last House on the Left (1972) with original writer and director Wes Craven as a producer. The company intended to preserve the storyline of the original film. In September 2006, it was announced that Craven had formed a production company, Midnight Pictures, under the umbrella of Rogue Pictures, and the remake for The Last House on the Left was selected as the company's first project. One of the reasons Craven agreed to remake The Last House on the Left was because of the money involved. In 1972, he did not have the budget to film every piece of the story he wanted to tell.

With the 2009 remake, a larger budget allowed the filmmakers to pace themselves more during filming, taking more care while shooting, and expand the scope of the story more. One of the ways to accomplish this was for the producers to find a "rising young director to bring a new perspective for the story". Eli Roth was originally approached to direct the project, as he had attempted to get a remake of The Last House on the Left off the ground years prior, but Roth turned it down on advice from Quentin Tarantino to instead film Hostel: Part 2 (2007). Dennis Iliadis was eventually chosen because the producers were impressed with his short film Hardcore, which explored the world of teenage prostitution. Co-producer Cody Zwieg stated, "Hardcore wasn't a genre or a horror film but showed completely believable characters in horrific, realistic situations. Many directors could handle the surface elements, the blood and shock moments of Last House, but Dennis proved that he could do it all without exploiting his characters and their situations." According to Iliadis, the director was quick to accept the responsibility of remaking The Last House on the Left, having already been a fan of Craven's and seen all of his films.

Writing

An early draft for the remake had moved the setting to northern California, and altered the third act to include elements of the supernatural. When that script was rejected, Carl Ellsworth was brought in to touch up the script written by Adam Alleca. Ellsworth had previously worked with Craven on Red Eye (2005), but had never seen the original film. After reading the script and watching the 1972 film, the latter he found difficult to watch because of its extreme nature, Ellsworth decided that the first thing they needed to do was to establish someone whose survival you wanted the audience to root for. The writer wanted to know how the "typical family" would react to such a heinous act being perpetrated on their daughter, and what they were truly capable of. Craven points out that most of the early script problems were based around deciding what elements to include. They were never sure how much of the Krug family needed to be seen, what elements from the original film should be included, or even if Mari should live or die.

One of the changes that Ellsworth made was keeping Mari alive, as the character is found dead in the original film. The writer believes keeping Mari alive when her parents find her adds to the suspense, because there is now a "ticking clock" for the parents to get their daughter to the hospital. Another change to the character was making her a swimmer. Director Iliadis wanted to give Mari a "big character trait" that could be used as a coping mechanism for the character, as well as become an important component to her escaping Krug. As Iliadis explains, "Well the idea was to find something where she channels all her energy and that was a big character trait because her brother is dead. It's like she's carrying him on her back. She needs to perform for two people now. She has to compensate for him so all her energy is in the water. The only area where she feels slightly free is when she's in the water swimming like crazy, so it's interesting having that as a character trait, and then having that as a key element for her trying to escape."

The writer changed the fate of another character, Krug's son Justin attempting to give the audience a better "sense of hope". Craven points out that early on he suggested that Krug have a son who commits suicide, but found it interesting to see  "this strange Romeo and Juliet thing happening" between Krug's son and Mari. He also stated that he likes the fact that John Collingwood is a doctor who actually gets to use his skills in the film, unlike in the original where the character is merely identified as being a doctor. Craven comments, "[it is] an extraordinary moment" when John is forced to improvise a way to restore a collapsed lung; "It made it real." Ellsworth wanted to create a level of interest in the characters that would "engage [the audience]", as opposed to simply leaving the family in "even worse shape [by] the end of the movie". He asserts that the film does not have a happy ending, but that there is some hope left at the end. Director Dennis Iliadis further explains that the point is to show the family from a different light. Initially the director feared that they were "wussing out" with the ending; he eventually decided that what you really see is a family that has physically survived this encounter, but are "dead in many ways". Iliadis expressed that he did not want to go the way of "torture porn", which is what he sees most horror films moving toward, but instead show a sense of "urgency" with the parents' actions.

Casting
When casting for the film, Iliadis wanted to find actors who would not portray these characters in a stereotypical way. As Craven explains, they wanted someone who would take these characters in a direction that most actors would not—they wanted originality. Craven states, "You need an actor who can bring a complete sense of commitment to that character without making it silly and not be afraid to go in there to the point where someone might say, 'Oh, you got bad in you?' You have to be brave enough and mature enough to know we've all got it, and you're not afraid of putting it out there and if you've got a problem with seeing that, tough." For instance, Iliadis wanted to avoid casting some superficially sexy actress in the role of Mari, because he did not want the rape sequence to appear enjoyable to the viewers in any possible way. Iliadis notes that when Sara Paxton came in her audition was "good", but it was this sense of intelligence and intensity that Paxton brought with her. The actress also had the "innocent face" the director was looking for, someone who had this "wholesomely American look" that would not allow anyone to enjoy watching her go through these intense events.

Iliadis auditioned dozens of actors before he hired Garret Dillahunt for the role of Krug, the leader of the family that kidnaps Mari. According to Iliadis, the actors coming in kept trying to portray Krug as the "typical bad guy", and that was not what the director wanted. In Iliadis's opinion, "the most sadistic criminal will smile"; when Dillahunt came in he brought a slyness to the character, and created "ambiguity and subtleties" to the character that Iliadis liked. Dillahunt attempted to humanize Krug by approaching the character more as a man who feels some love for his son, but is bitter about how his life has turned out and is fearful that he is losing his position as the leader. He further clarifies that Krug fails to take responsibility for his own actions, instead blaming others, and prefers to deliver his own "twisted justice" to those he feels have wronged him.

Dillahunt took inspiration from Andrew Cunanan, the man who killed Gianni Versace, when he recalled the brutality in which Cunanan murdered a man just for his car. Dillahunt recalls how an FBI profiler noted that this type of rage is typically directed toward someone the perpetrator knows, yet Cunanan managed to pull some element from his own life and place it on this random person who attempted to stand his ground against the would-be carjacker. To Dillahunt, that was how he wanted to approach Krug. To him, Mari actually shows that she is not afraid of Krug, which causes him to go "crazy". That being said, the actor felt like the scene where his character rapes Mari was one of the hardest things emotionally to film. He notes that part of him was happy that Sara Paxton was cast as Mari, because they had worked together in the past, so they knew each other. On the other hand, he felt uncomfortable acting out such a scene with a person he considered to be a friend. Paxton echoed his sentiments to Craven, who stated the actress expressed to him a greater feeling of trust that the person who would have to do these "horrible" things to her was someone she knew, and as a result made them at least partially more bearable to act.

At the time Riki Lindhome was called in to audition for the role of Sadie, December 2007, she had not heard of Craven's original film. On the day of her audition, Lindhome was informed that she had missed her scheduled appointment and that she would need to return come January. Lindhome took the time to watch the original movie and read an article in Vanity Fair about the film, giving her some familiarity with the story and her role when she went to audition. Lindhome says she finds her character "creepy for no apparent reason", because the film does not attempt to justify why the three antagonists do what they do. The actress characterizes Sadie as being "equally as bad as [the men]", being just as vicious as the others. Lindhome admits that early in production it was easier for her to detach herself from the violent character she was portraying, but as filming continued and the cast grew closer she says that it became more difficult and "upsetting" to perform some of the scenes. According to Lindhome, as a response to seeing how some of the scenes were affecting the women, the producers sent Paxton, Lindhome, and Martha MacIsaac to a spa for a weekend.

Before filming started, some of the actors had to undergo various training exercises for their roles. Dillahunt, Lindhome, and Aaron Paul—the latter portrays Francis—had to take part in gun training, while Sara Paxton had to get up each morning for swimming lessons so that she looked like an experienced swimmer. Iliadis also spent several weeks with the actors in rehearsal. It was Iliadis's hope that space to rehearse their roles, and then time during filming to develop their characters individually, would help them to trust Iliadis as the director more.

Filming
Craven chose to give Iliadis his freedom while filming the remake, partially because Craven was in the process of working on a new film for himself, My Soul to Take (2010), but also because he likes to allow the directors the chance to make their own film. For the 2009 remake, Iliadis wanted to keep a consistency among the scenes of his film, as compared to the 1972 original. Iliadis stated that he felt the intercutting of comedic scenes with the rape scene in the 1972 film had the tendency to take one out of the moment. Iliadis wanted to "cut those diversions out", as a way of "[throwing the audience] into this scene with no place to cut away to". For Iliadis, taking this approach helped to create more drama for the event. The producers brought in a medical technician to provide insight, based on his job experience witnessing the people's deaths, and lend realism to the actors' portrayals. Lindhome states that the technician would explain how someone would react given a particular event, like getting shot or stabbed. Iliadis also felt that his work on Hardcore helped to train him for this film. As the director points out, Hardcore contained "very difficult scenes", like a sixteen-year-old girl having an "existential breakdown during an orgy", and Iliadis sees those scenes as training for him to learn how to make sure the actors are still being respected, as well as making sure that the scene is focused on the characters instead of simply going for "titillation".

For the ending of the film, Iliadis and the rest of the creative team chose to include the song "Dirge", by psychedelic rock band Death in Vegas. Iliadis was hoping to find something that was both "ironic" and "innocent" at the same time, given the events in the film that would precede its usage. To the director, the choice helped to illuminate the fact that nothing will be the same for this family again. Craven comments on the choice to have John Collingwood return to finish off Krug at the end. Craven explains, "I also found it interesting that the Dr., whose oath 'does no harm', intentionally [kills Krug] and that it kinda shows that when seeking revenge you can become something evil yourself if you don't stop once what's been necessary is done. So I also found it intriguing that we're just seeing these wonderful, perfect people but the father comes back and goes out of his way to do this."

Release
The Last House on the Left was released on March 13, 2009, to 2,402 theaters. The MPAA ratings board ordered multiple cuts to the film to achieve a R-rating. The biggest setback by the board involved the rape scene. In the original cut of the film, the scene was at least one minute longer, but the board forced the scene to be trimmed if the filmmakers wanted an R-rating. There were other minor aspects trimmed as well, like an extended stabbing sequence with Paige. What shocked Craven was when the MPAA told them that this was a "special" film that did not "need" the extension on those scenes. Craven believed that the MPAA viewed the film more as an artistic horror film, which he sees as both a blessing and a curse. In Craven's experience, once the MPAA becomes focused on certain elements they dislike in horror films that they otherwise like, they become determined to see it removed before release. The DVD and Blu-ray copies of the film, which were released on August 18, 2009, contain both a rated and unrated cut. The DVD sales have brought in approximately $20 million in revenue.

Reception

Box office
On its opening day, The Last House on the Left grossed $5,630,345, on 2,800 screens across 2,402 theaters, putting it slightly ahead of Watchmen, the previous weekend's top film, with approximately $5,304,344. From March 13 - 15, The Last House on the Left took in an additional $5,318,215 and $3,170,125, respectively, to round out its opening weekend with $14,118,685. By comparison, the 1972 original earned an estimated $3.1 million, in unadjusted dollars, during its entire box office run. Adjusting for inflation, that would be approximately $16,468,225 in 2009. As of August 18, 2009 the film has grossed $45,286,226 worldwide.

Critical response
, The Last House on the Left holds a 42% approval rating on Rotten Tomatoes, based on 165 reviews with an average rating of 4.93/10. The site's critics' consensus reads: "Excessive and gory, this remake lacks the intellectual punch of the 1972 original." By comparison, on Metacritic, which assigns a normalized rating out of 100 to reviews from mainstream critics, the film has received an average score of 42 based on 27 reviews. CinemaScore polls reported that the average grade cinemagoers gave the film was "B" on an A+ to F scale, with exit polling showing that 57% of the audience was female, 60% was under 25, and with Hispanics and Caucasians making up 36% and 35%, respectively.

The San Francisco Chronicles Peter Hartlaub felt the remake departed from the traditional template used by more recent remakes—"include twice as many kills, [find] boring young actors from TV shows, rewrite the script so you lose everything interesting about the original, [and] make up an excuse to add cell phones"—which ultimately made it far more effective. Hartlaub cited the script, which he felt devoted as much time to character development as "carnage", and the "good acting", particularly Tony Goldwyn, as reasons why this remake succeeds. Kyle Smith, of the New York Post, agreed that the film succeeded where other remakes had failed. For Smith, it was the replacement of the "quick-cutting, loud noises and camera tricks" clichés with "long takes, genuinely disturbing violence and stretches with no dialogue to pin you to the story", which made this film more effective. Smith also commended Dillahunt's acting, as well as Iliadis's "casual, matter-of-fact approach that multiplies the horror to an almost unbearable level". In contrast, USA Today's Claudia Puig stated that director Dennis Iliadis failed at trying to keep the film from becoming another "torture porn". Puig felt that the killing scenes were too drawn out, noting the technique was down to heighten the effect, but actually comes across more as "repugnant and fetishized violence". She also noted that the parents seemed to find enjoyment in exacting their revenge, even when their daughter lay dying in the next room. Joe Neumaier of the New York Daily News was in agreement with Puig when he referred to the film as "stomach-churningly anti-human" because of its violence, and questioned why Goldwyn and Potter even signed on to the film. Neumaier suggests that the film's violence fails to create the sense of "theatricality of the Saw or Hostel films", or even provide audiences with "the unkillable-monster nostalgia of [the] Friday the 13th re-do". Neumaier also states that the 2009 film lacks the reasoning to exist that Craven's 1972 original had, which was to push the "boundaries of cinema's new permissiveness".

When comparing the 2009 film to its 1972 counterpart, Newsdays Rafer Guzman stated that Iliadis's film contains better "production values" than the 1972 original, but overall it keeps the "marrow of the story". Guzman suggests that some of the violence may have ventured too close to hysteria, and that this film is not like The Virgin Spring—which Guzman reminds that Roger Ebert "famously compared the original to"—but overall the film is "horribly, shamefully satisfying". Michael Phillips of the Chicago Tribune, who disliked the 1972 film and went so far as to call the original "unstable trash", found the remake to be a better film. Phillips noted that the 2009 film was well written—apart from a couple of moments that felt like they belonged in a different movie—well acted, and contains characters that seem like "real people [with] plausible behavior, amid plausible tension, borne of a terrible situation". He also suggests that, contrary to other critic opinion, the 2009 remake does not attempt to follow the current trend of Hostel or Saw-like films simply because audiences are gravitating toward them as of late. Mark Olsen, of the Los Angeles Times, believes the 2009 remake is "deeply misguided refraction of the original". Olsen points to what he feels is the addition of unnecessary back story for the family, and Iliadis's choice to film the rape scene in a "verdant, scenic forest", which gave the sequence an "art-directed falseness, draining the audience-implicating authenticity and replacing it with the easy distance of knowing entertainment". Olsen also felt that changing the trinket Mari holds in the original film to a keepsake from her deceased brother turns the family into "heroic characters" who appear to be "defending their entitlement to a rustic second home and vintage motorboat, not their right to exist".

Dennis Harvey of Variety believed that the film lacked in comparison to the 1972 original in almost every aspect. Harvey felt like the film spent more time trying to please current horror conventions than create an effective update to Craven's film. Harvey criticized the choice of changing a "credibly ordinary family" into "typical modern movie-fantasy clan". He also noted that Dillahunt's portrayal of Krug is no match for David Hess. Michael Rechtshaffen, from The Hollywood Reporter, felt that the remake followed close to the original—something fans of the 1972 film would appreciate—but that the film lacked the timing of the Craven's film. Craven was responding to the graphic images being sent back during the Vietnam War and allowed his film "sociological context", while Iliadis's 2009 film comes across as "exploitative". Although Rechtshaffen points out that the parents lack the training and skill of Liam Neeson's character in Taken, the performances from all of the actors are "uniformly sturdy".

Lisa Kennedy of The Denver Post suggested that some viewers may want to leave the theater before finishing the movie, as Paige and Mari's fight to survive is "so disturbing" and "earnest", the murders and rapes so "verite" that it forced the reviewer to "fear for women in the audience who have been victims of rape". Yet, Kennedy believes the film manages to create a deeper message by identifying the "truly horrific" nature of what occurs by following the events with "a deep pause". Comparing this remake to the multiple Michael Bay slasher remakes, Kennedy states that this film "is not an idea-free flick", and that it "[engages] what the word 'horror' means". Roger Ebert, who gave the film a mildly positive review of 2.5 out of 4 stars, was also appalled by the rape sequence of the film, and noted that the rest of the violence seemed to fall within the standard of trying to invent new ways to kill people simply to please horror fans. At the same time, he praised the performances of Goldwyn, Potter, Paxton, and Dillahunt. He noted that the audience actually fears for the parents, and that Dillahunt is convincing as the "evil leader of a pack of degenerates".

See also

List of films featuring home invasions

References

External links

 
 
 
 
 
 
 

2009 films
2009 crime thriller films
2009 horror films
2000s English-language films
2000s horror thriller films
2000s serial killer films
Adaptations of works by Wes Craven
American crime thriller films
American horror thriller films
American rape and revenge films
American serial killer films
Crime horror films
Films about child abduction in the United States
Films about violence against women
Films directed by Dennis Iliadis
Films scored by John Murphy (composer)
Films shot in South Africa
Horror film remakes
Remakes of American films
Universal Pictures films
2000s American films